The 4710th Air Defense Wing is a discontinued unit of the United States Air Force. It was last stationed at O'Hare International Airport, Illinois, where it was assigned to the 37th Air Division of Air Defense Command (ADC), and where it was discontinued in 1956. It was established in 1952 at New Castle AFB, Delaware as the 4710th Defense Wing in a general reorganization of Air Defense Command (ADC), which replaced wings responsible for a base with wings responsible for a geographical area. It assumed control of several fighter Interceptor squadrons that had been assigned to the 113th Fighter-Interceptor Wing, which was an Air National Guard wing mobilized for the Korean War.

In early 1953 it also was assigned five radar squadrons in Virginia, Pennsylvania, and New Jersey and its fighter squadron at New Castle combined with the colocated air base squadron into an air defense group. The wing was redesignated as an air defense wing in 1954. In the spring of 1956, its subordinate units were reassigned and it moved to O'Hare as ADC prepared for the implementation of the Semi-Automatic Ground Environment (SAGE) air defense system.

History
The wing was organized as the 4710th Defense Wing at the beginning of February 1952 at New Castle AFB, Delaware and assigned to Eastern Air Defense Force as part of a major reorganization of ADC responding to ADC's difficulty under the existing wing base organizational structure in deploying fighter squadrons to best advantage. It assumed operational control and the air defense mission of fighter squadrons formerly assigned to the inactivating Air National Guard (ANG) 113th Fighter-Interceptor Wing (FIW). The 142d Fighter-Interceptor Squadron (FIS) was located at New Castle with the wing headquarters, the 148th FIS was a few miles away at Dover AFB, Delaware, and the 121st FIS was stationed at Andrews AFB, Maryland. All three squadrons flew radar equipped Lockheed F-94 Starfire interceptor aircraft. The 113th FIW had been called to active duty and moved to New Castle to replace elements of the 4th FIW which had deployed to Far East Air Force because of the Korean War. The wing's mission was to train and maintain tactical flying units in state of readiness in order to defend Northeast United States. The wing's 82nd Air Base Squadron assumed base support duties at New Castle from inactivating elements of the 113th FIW. In November 1952, the 121st, 142nd, and 148th FIS were returned to the control of the ANG and replaced by the 46th FIS at Dover, the 95th FIS at Andrews, and the 96th FIS at New Castle.

At the beginning of 1953, the 48th FIS, which was converting from World War II era F-47 Thunderbolts to F-84 Thunderjet aircraft, moved from Grenier AFB, New Hampshire to Langley AFB, Virginia and was assigned to the wing. In February 1953, another major reorganization of ADC activated Air Defense Groups at ADC bases with dispersed fighter squadrons. Air Defense Groups were assigned to defense wings and assumed direct control of the fighter squadrons at those bases, as well as support squadrons to carry out their role as the USAF host organizations at the bases. As a result of this reorganization, the 525th Air Defense Group activated at New Castle. The reorganization also resulted in the wing adding the radar detection, control and warning mission, and it was assigned four Aircraft Control & Warning Squadrons (AC&W Sq) to perform this mission, although one was reassigned a few months later. In the same reorganization, the wing was reassigned to the 26th Air Division. Fighter squadrons of the wing converted to newer aircraft during the year, the 48th FIS joined the other squadrons of the wing in flying Starfires, although the 95th FIS abandoned its Starfires for F-86 Sabres.

In 1955, ADC implemented Project Arrow, which was designed to bring back on the active list the fighter units which had compiled memorable records in the two world wars. As a result of this project, the 82nd Fighter Group (Air Defense) replaced the 525th Air Def Gp at New Castle, but because of impending changes in air defense system boundaries, it was soon assigned directly to the 26th Air Division.

In March 1956, the wing's components were reassigned to the 26th and 85th Air Divisions and the reduced strength wing moved to Illinois as ADC prepared for the implementation of the Semi-Automatic Ground Environment (SAGE) air defense system. It was discontinued there in July.

Lineage
 Designated as the 4710th Defense Wing and organized on 1 February 1952
 Redesignated as 4710th Air Defense Wing on 1 July 1954
 Discontinued on 8 July 1956

Assignments
 Eastern Air Defense Force, 1 February 1952
 26th Air Division, 16 February 1953
 37th Air Division, 1 March 1956 – 8 July 1956

Components

Groups
 82d Fighter Group (Air Defense), 18 August 1955 – 1 March 1956
 525th Air Defense Group, 16 February 1953 – 18 August 1955

Squadrons

Fighter Squadrons
 46th Fighter-Interceptor Squadron
 Dover AFB, Delaware, 1 November 1952 – 1 March 1956
 48th Fighter-Interceptor Squadron
 Langley AFB, Virginia, 14 January 1953 – 1 March 1956
 95th Fighter-Interceptor Squadron
 Andrews AFB, Maryland, 1 November 1952 – 1 March 1956
 96th Fighter-Interceptor Squadron, 1 November 1952 – 16 February 1953
 121st Fighter-Interceptor Squadron
 Andrews AFB, Maryland, 6 February 1952 – 1 November 1952
 142d Fighter-Interceptor Squadron, 6 February 1952 – 1 November 1952
 148th Fighter-Interceptor Squadron
 Dover AFB, Delaware, 6 February 1952 – 1 November 1952

Support Squadron
 82nd Air Base Squadron, 1 February 1952 – 16 February 1953

Radar Squadrons
 647th Aircraft Control and Warning Squadron
 Manassas AFS, Virginia, 16 February 1953 – 1 March 1956
 648th Aircraft Control and Warning Squadron
 Ricketts Glen State Park, Pennsylvania, 16 February 1953 – 30 June 1953
 770th Aircraft Control and Warning Squadron
 Palermo AFS, New Jersey, 16 February 1953 – 1 March 1956
 771st Aircraft Control and Warning Squadron
 Cape Charles AFS, Virginia, 16 February 1953 – 1 March 1956
 772d Aircraft Control and Warning Group
 Claysburg AFS, Virginia, 16 February 1953 – 1 March 1956

Stations
 New Castle Air Force Base (originally New Castle Airport), Delaware, 6 February 1952
 O'Hare International Airport, Illinois, 1 March 1956 – 8 July 1956

Aircraft
 F-47D, 1953
 F-84G, 1953
 F-86D, 1953–1956
 F-94B, 1952–1953
 F-94C, 1953–1956

Commanders
 Col. G. B. Greene, Jr., 6 February 1952 – 14 July 1952
 Col. Milton H. Ashkins, 14 July 1952 – 1956

See also
 List of MAJCOM wings of the United States Air Force
 List of United States Air Force Aerospace Defense Command Interceptor Squadrons
 List of United States Air Force aircraft control and warning squadrons

References

Notes

Bibliography

 Buss, Lydus H.(ed), Sturm, Thomas A., Volan, Denys, and McMullen, Richard F., History of Continental Air Defense Command and Air Defense Command July to December 1955, Directorate of Historical Services, Air Defense Command, Ent AFB, CO, (1956)
 
 
 Grant, C.L., (1961) The Development of Continental Air Defense to 1 September 1954, USAF Historical Study No. 126

Further reading
 
 
 
 

4710
Air defense wings of the United States Air Force
Military units and formations established in 1952
Military units and formations disestablished in 1956
Military units and formations in Delaware